Ram Kripal Yadav (born 12 October 1957) is an Indian politician and a member of the 17th Lok Sabha from the Pataliputra parliamentary constituency in Bihar. He was a member of Rashtriya Janata Dal and was a close confidant of Lalu Yadav. Later he joined Bharatiya Janata Party. He was first a mayor in Bihar, and later the Minister of State for Rural Development in central cabinet in Delhi from 2014 to 2019.

Early life
Yadav was born on 12 October 1957. He attained the Bachelor of Arts (Honours) and Bachelor of Law degrees from Magadh University, Patna.

Political career
Yadav represented the Patna (Lok Sabha constituency) constituency of Bihar winning thrice from there in the year 1991, 1996, and 2004 elections as a member of Rashtriya Janata Dal. He joined BJP in 2014, and has won 2014 and 2019 parliamentary elections as a member of BJP from Pataliputra (Lok Sabha constituency).

He did not contest the 15th general elections in 2009 from Patna as the RJD leader Lalu Yadav himself contested and lost from that constituency. Ram Kripal Yadav wanted to contest from Pataliputra seat in 2014 but was denied ticket. In March 2014 Ramkripal Yadav resigned from Rashtriya Janata Dal and joined BJP.

He won the Pataliputra Lok Sabha seat in 2014 as a member of BJP after defeating Lalu Yadav's daughter Misa Bharti. He was made a Minister of State in Government of India by Narendra Modi from 2014 to 2019. He retained his Lok Sabha seat in 2019.

Offices held

 1985-1986 :- Deputy Mayor, Patna Municipal Corporation 
 1992-1993 :- Member, Bihar Legislative Council 
 1993-1996 :- Elected to 10th Lok Sabha (elected in bye election) 
 1996-1997	:- Re-elected to 11th Lok Sabha (2nd term)
 1998-2004 :- Member, Bihar Legislative Council
 1998-2005 :- Chairman, Bihar Dharmik Nayas Parishad (Rank equivalent to State Cabinet Minister in Government of Bihar)
 2004-2009 :- Re-elected to 14th Lok Sabha (3rd term)
 Member, Standing Committee on Information Technology
 Member, Committee on Security in Parliament Complex
 5 August 2007 :- Member, Standing Committee on Petroleum & Natural Gas
 1 May 2008 :- Member, Committee on Public Undertakings
 2010 - 16 May 2014 :- Elected to Rajya Sabha
 2010 :- Member, Committee on Defence 
 2010 :- Member, Consultative Committee for the Ministry of Coal and Ministry of Statistics and Programme Implementation
 Chairman :- Dr. Ambedkar Institute of Sports and Culture, Bihar
 2014-2019 :- Re-elected to 16th Lok Sabha (4th term)
 14 August 2014 - 9 November 2014 :- Member, Committee on Estimates
 1 September 2014 - 9 November 2014 :- Member, Standing Committee on Science & Technology, Environment & Forests
 1 September 2014 - 9 November 2014 :- Member, Consultative Committee, Ministry of Railways
 9 November 2014 - 5 July 2016 :- Union Minister of State for Ministry of Drinking Water and Sanitation
 5 July 2016 - 25 May 2019 :- Union Minister of State for Ministry of Rural Department
 May 2019 :- Re-elected to 17th Lok Sabha (5th term)
 24 July 2019 onwards :- Member, Committee on Public Accounts
 13 September 2019 onwards :- Member, Standing Committee on Agriculture
 9 October 2019 onwards :- Member, Committee on Subordinate Legislation
 9 October 2019 onwards :- Member, Consultative Committee, Ministry of Petroleum and Natural Gas

References

External links
 
 Home Page on the Parliament of India's Website

1957 births
Living people
Politicians from Patna
India MPs 2004–2009
Bharatiya Janata Party politicians from Bihar
Lok Sabha members from Bihar
India MPs 1991–1996
India MPs 1996–1997
India MPs 2014–2019
Rajya Sabha members from Bihar
Rashtriya Janata Dal politicians
Janata Dal politicians
Narendra Modi ministry
India MPs 2019–present
Magadh University alumni